Shane Lee Turner (born January 8, 1963) is an American former professional baseball player. He played in parts of three seasons in the Major League Baseball (MLB) for three different teams.

Career
Turner attended Garey High School in Pomona CA A product of Pomona SouthWest Little League and was originally selected by the New York Yankees in the 6th round of the 1985 MLB draft after playing in the College World Series twice for Cal State Fullerton. In , he was traded with fellow prospect Keith Hughes to the Philadelphia Phillies for outfielder Mike Easler. Turner made his MLB debut the following year, going 6-for-35 in 18 games.

The latter was his most successful big league stint, as he batted .270 in 34 games, but in  it was back to the minors for Turner.

In , he replaced Dave Machemer as manager of the Connecticut Defenders in mid-season. He currently is the coordinator of instruction for the San Francisco Giants organization.

References

External links

1963 births
Living people
Albany-Colonie Yankees players
American expatriate baseball players in Canada
Baltimore Orioles players
Baseball coaches from California
Baseball players from Los Angeles
Birmingham Barons players
Calgary Cannons players
Cal State Fullerton Titans baseball players
Columbus Clippers players
Fort Lauderdale Yankees players
Hagerstown Suns players
Long Beach Barracudas players
Maine Phillies players
Major League Baseball third basemen
Major League Baseball outfielders
Minor league baseball managers
Oneonta Yankees players
Philadelphia Phillies players
Phoenix Firebirds players
Reading Phillies players
Rochester Red Wings players
Salem-Keizer Volcanoes
San Francisco Giants scouts
Seattle Mariners players